Martin Fisch (born 26 January 1993) is a Danish footballer who most recently played for Helsingør.

References

Danish men's footballers
Danish Superliga players
1993 births
Living people
Akademisk Boldklub players
Hvidovre IF players
Hellerup IK players
FC Helsingør players
Association football defenders